

Peerage of England

|Duke of Cornwall (1337)||none||1537||1603||
|-
|rowspan="2"|Marquess of Winchester (1551)||William Paulet, 3rd Marquess of Winchester||1576||1598||Died
|-
|William Paulet, 4th Marquess of Winchester||1598||1628||
|-
|Earl of Oxford (1142)||Edward de Vere, 17th Earl of Oxford||1562||1604||
|-
|rowspan="2"|Earl of Shrewsbury (1442)||George Talbot, 6th Earl of Shrewsbury||1560||1590||Died
|-
|Gilbert Talbot, 7th Earl of Shrewsbury||1590||1616||
|-
|Earl of Kent (1465)||Henry Grey, 6th Earl of Kent||1573||1615||
|-
|rowspan="3"|Earl of Derby (1485)||Henry Stanley, 4th Earl of Derby||1572||1593||Died
|-
|Ferdinando Stanley, 5th Earl of Derby||1593||1594||Died
|-
|William Stanley, 6th Earl of Derby||1594||1642||
|-
|Earl of Worcester (1514)||Edward Somerset, 4th Earl of Worcester||1589||1628||
|-
|Earl of Cumberland (1525)||George Clifford, 3rd Earl of Cumberland||1570||1605||
|-
|Earl of Rutland (1525)||Roger Manners, 5th Earl of Rutland||1588||1612||
|-
|rowspan="2"|Earl of Huntingdon (1529)||Henry Hastings, 3rd Earl of Huntingdon||1561||1595||Died
|-
|George Hastings, 4th Earl of Huntingdon||1595||1604||
|-
|rowspan="2"|Earl of Sussex (1529)||Henry Radclyffe, 4th Earl of Sussex||1583||1593||Died
|-
|Robert Radclyffe, 5th Earl of Sussex||1593||1629||
|-
|Earl of Bath (1536)||William Bourchier, 3rd Earl of Bath||1561||1623||
|-
|Earl of Southampton (1547)||Henry Wriothesley, 3rd Earl of Southampton||1581||1624||
|-
|Earl of Bedford (1550)||Edward Russell, 3rd Earl of Bedford||1585||1627||
|-
|Earl of Pembroke (1551)||Henry Herbert, 2nd Earl of Pembroke||1570||1601||
|-
|Earl of Devon (1553)||William Courtenay, de jure 3rd Earl of Devon||1557||1630||
|-
|Earl of Northumberland (1557)||Henry Percy, 9th Earl of Northumberland||1585||1632||
|-
|Earl of Hertford (1559)||Edward Seymour, 1st Earl of Hertford||1559||1621||
|-
|Earl of Warwick (1561)||Ambrose Dudley, 1st Earl of Warwick||1561||1590||Died, title extinct
|-
|Earl of Essex (1572)||Robert Devereux, 2nd Earl of Essex||1576||1601||
|-
|Earl of Lincoln (1572)||Henry Clinton, 2nd Earl of Lincoln||1585||1616||
|-
|Earl of Nottingham (1596)||Charles Howard, 1st Earl of Nottingham||1596||1624||New creation
|-
|rowspan="2"|Viscount Montagu (1554)||Anthony Browne, 1st Viscount Montagu||1554||1592||Died
|-
|Anthony-Maria Browne, 2nd Viscount Montagu||1592||1629||
|-
|rowspan="2"|Viscount Howard of Bindon (1559)||Henry Howard, 2nd Viscount Howard of Bindon||1582||1590||Died
|-
|Thomas Howard, 3rd Viscount Howard of Bindon||1590||1611||
|-
|rowspan="2"|Baron de Ros (1264)||Elizabeth Cecil, 16th Baroness de Ros||1587||1591||Died
|-
|William Cecil, 17th Baron de Ros||1591||1618||
|-
|rowspan="2"|Baron Grey de Wilton (1295)||Arthur Grey, 14th Baron Grey de Wilton||1562||1593||Died
|-
|Thomas Grey, 15th Baron Grey de Wilton||1593||1604||
|-
|Baron Morley (1299)||Edward Parker, 12th Baron Morley||1577||1618||
|- 
|Baron Zouche of Haryngworth (1308)||Edward la Zouche, 11th Baron Zouche||1569||1625||
|- 
|Baron Audley of Heleigh (1313)||George Tuchet, 11th Baron Audley||1563||1617||
|- 
|rowspan="2"|Baron Cobham of Kent (1313)||William Brooke, 10th Baron Cobham||1558||1597||Died
|- 
|Henry Brooke, 11th Baron Cobham||1597||1603||
|- 
|Baron Willoughby de Eresby (1313)||Peregrine Bertie, 13th Baron Willoughby de Eresby||1580||1601||
|- 
|rowspan="2"|Baron Dacre (1321)||Gregory Fiennes, 10th Baron Dacre||1558||1594||Died
|- 
|Margaret Fiennes, 11th Baroness Dacre||1594||1612||
|- 
|rowspan="2"|Baron Scrope of Bolton (1371)||Henry Scrope, 9th Baron Scrope of Bolton||1549||1591||Died
|- 
|Thomas Scrope, 10th Baron Scrope of Bolton||1591||1609||
|- 
|Baron Bergavenny (1392)||Mary Fane, 7th Baroness Bergavenny||1585||1626||
|- 
|Baron Berkeley (1421)||Henry Berkeley, 7th Baron Berkeley||1534||1613||
|- 
|Baron Dudley (1440)||Edward Sutton, 5th Baron Dudley||1586||1643||
|- 
|Baron Saye and Sele (1447)||Richard Fiennes, 7th Baron Saye and Sele||1573||1613||
|- 
|Baron Stourton (1448)||Edward Stourton, 10th Baron Stourton||1588||1633||
|- 
|Baron Ogle (1461)||Cuthbert Ogle, 7th Baron Ogle||1562||1597||Died, Barony fell into abeyance, until 1625
|- 
|rowspan="2"|Baron Mountjoy (1465)||William Blount, 7th Baron Mountjoy||1582||1594||Died
|- 
|Charles Blount, 8th Baron Mountjoy||1594||1606||
|- 
|Baron Willoughby de Broke (1491)||Fulke Greville, 4th Baron Willoughby de Broke||1562||1606||
|-

|Baron Monteagle (1514)||William Parker, 4th Baron Monteagle||1581||1622||
|-
|rowspan="2"|Baron Vaux of Harrowden (1523)||William Vaux, 3rd Baron Vaux of Harrowden||1556||1595||Died
|-
|Edward Vaux, 4th Baron Vaux of Harrowden||1595||1661||
|-
|Baron Sandys of the Vine (1529)||William Sandys, 3rd Baron Sandys||1560||1623||
|-
|rowspan="2"|Baron Burgh (1529)||Thomas Burgh, 3rd Baron Burgh||1584||1597||Died
|-
|Robert Burgh, 4th Baron Burgh||1597||1602||
|-
|Baron Windsor (1529)||Henry Windsor, 5th Baron Windsor||1585||1605||
|-
|rowspan="2"|Baron Wentworth (1529)||Henry Wentworth, 3rd Baron Wentworth||1584||1593||Died
|-
|Thomas Wentworth, 4th Baron Wentworth||1593||1667||
|-
|Baron Mordaunt (1532)||Lewis Mordaunt, 3rd Baron Mordaunt||1571||1601||
|-
|rowspan="2"|Baron Cromwell (1540)||Henry Cromwell, 2nd Baron Cromwell||1551||1593||Died
|-
|Edward Cromwell, 3rd Baron Cromwell||1593||1607||
|-
|rowspan="2"|Baron Eure (1544)||William Eure, 2nd Baron Eure||1548||1594||Died
|-
|Ralph Eure, 3rd Baron Eure||1594||1617||
|-
|Baron Wharton (1545)||Philip Wharton, 3rd Baron Wharton||1572||1625||
|-
|Baron Sheffield (1547)||Edmund Sheffield, 3rd Baron Sheffield||1568||1646||
|-
|Baron Rich (1547)||Robert Rich, 3rd Baron Rich||1581||1618||
|-
|Baron Willoughby of Parham (1547)||Charles Willoughby, 2nd Baron Willoughby of Parham||1570||1612||
|-
|Baron Lumley (1547)||John Lumley, 1st Baron Lumley||1547||1609||
|-
|Baron Darcy of Aston (1548)||John Darcy, 2nd Baron Darcy of Aston||1558||1602||
|-
|Baron Darcy of Chiche (1551)||Thomas Darcy, 3rd Baron Darcy of Chiche||1581||1640||
|-
|Baron North (1554)||Roger North, 2nd Baron North||1564||1600||
|-
|Baron Howard of Effingham (1554)||Charles Howard, 2nd Baron Howard of Effingham||1573||1624||Created Earl of Nottingham, see above
|-
|rowspan="2"|Baron Chandos (1554)||Giles Brydges, 3rd Baron Chandos||1573||1594||Died
|-
|William Brydges, 4th Baron Chandos||1594||1602||
|-
|rowspan="2"|Baron Hunsdon (1559)||Henry Carey, 1st Baron Hunsdon||1559||1596||Died
|-
|George Carey, 2nd Baron Hunsdon||1596||1603||
|-
|rowspan="2"|Baron St John of Bletso (1559)||John St John, 2nd Baron St John of Bletso||1582||1596||Died
|-
|John St John, 2nd Baron St John of Bletso||1582||1596||
|-
|Baron Buckhurst (1567)||Thomas Sackville, 1st Baron Buckhurst||1567||1608||
|-
|rowspan="2"|Baron De La Warr (1570)||William West, 1st Baron De La Warr||1570||1595||Died
|-
|Thomas West, 2nd Baron De La Warr||1595||1602||
|-
|rowspan="2"|Baron Burghley (1571)||William Cecil, 1st Baron Burghley||1571||1598||
|-
|Thomas Cecil, 2nd Baron Burghley||1598||1623||
|-
|Baron Compton (1572)||William Compton, 2nd Baron Compton||1589||1630||
|-
|Baron Norreys (1572)||Henry Norris, 1st Baron Norreys||1572||1601||
|-
|Baron Howard de Walden (1597)||Thomas Howard, 1st Baron Howard de Walden||1597||1626||New creation
|-
|}

Peerage of Scotland

|Duke of Rothesay (1398)||Henry Frederick Stuart, Duke of Rothesay||1594||1612||
|-
|Duke of Lennox (1581)||Ludovic Stewart, 2nd Duke of Lennox||1583||1624||
|-
|Marquess of Huntly (1599)||George Gordon, 1st Marquess of Huntly||1599||1636||
|-
|Marquess of Hamilton (1599)||John Hamilton, 1st Marquess of Hamilton||1599||1604||
|-
|Earl of Mar (1114)||John Erskine, 19th/2nd Earl of Mar||1572||1634||
|-
|rowspan=2|Earl of Sutherland (1235)||Alexander Gordon, 12th Earl of Sutherland||1567||1594||Died
|-
|John Gordon, 13th Earl of Sutherland||1594||1615||
|-
|rowspan=2|Earl of Angus (1389)||William Douglas, 9th Earl of Angus||1588||1591||Died
|-
|William Douglas, 10th Earl of Angus||1591||1611||
|-
|Earl of Crawford (1398)||David Lindsay, 11th Earl of Crawford||1574||1607||
|-
|rowspan=2|Earl of Menteith (1427)||John Graham, 6th Earl of Menteith||1578||1598||Died
|-
|William Graham, 7th Earl of Menteith||1598||1661||
|-
|Earl of Huntly (1445)||George Gordon, 6th Earl of Huntly||1579||1636||Created Marquess of Huntley, see above
|-
|Earl of Erroll (1452)||Francis Hay, 9th Earl of Erroll||1585||1631||
|-
|Earl of Caithness (1455)||George Sinclair, 5th Earl of Caithness||1582||1643||
|-
|Earl of Argyll (1457)||Archibald Campbell, 7th Earl of Argyll||1584||1638||
|-
|Earl of Atholl (1457)||John Stewart, 5th Earl of Atholl||1579||1595||Died, title extinct
|-
|Earl of Morton (1458)||William Douglas, 6th Earl of Morton||1588||1606||
|-
|Earl of Rothes (1458)||Andrew Leslie, 5th Earl of Rothes||1558||1611||
|-
|Earl Marischal (1458)||George Keith, 5th Earl Marischal||1581||1623||
|-
|Earl of Buchan (1469)||James Douglas, 5th Earl of Buchan||1580||1601||
|-
|Earl of Glencairn (1488)||James Cunningham, 7th Earl of Glencairn||1578||1630||
|-
|Earl of Arran (1503)||James Hamilton, 3rd Earl of Arran||1575||1609||
|-
|Earl of Montrose (1503)||John Graham, 3rd Earl of Montrose||1571||1608||
|-
|Earl of Eglinton (1507)||Hugh Montgomerie, 5th Earl of Eglinton||1586||1612||
|-
|Earl of Cassilis (1509)||John Kennedy, 5th Earl of Cassilis||1576||1615||
|-
|rowspan=2|Earl of Moray (1562)||Elizabeth Stuart, 2nd Countess of Moray||1570||1591||Died
|-
|James Stuart, 3rd Earl of Moray||1591||1638||
|-
|Earl of Bothwell (1581)||Francis Stewart, 1st Earl of Bothwell||1581||1592||Attainted
|-
|Earl of Gowrie (1581)||John Ruthven, 3rd Earl of Gowrie||1588||1600||
|-
|rowspan=2|Earl of Orkney (1581)||Robert Stewart, 1st Earl of Orkney||1581||1593||Died
|-
|Patrick Stewart, 2nd Earl of Orkney||1593||1614||
|-
|Earl of Atholl (1596)||John Stewart, 1st Earl of Atholl||1596||1603||New creation
|-
|rowspan=2|Lord Somerville (1430)||Hugh Somerville, 7th Lord Somerville||1569||1597||Died
|-
|Gilbert Somerville, 8th Lord Somerville||1597||1618||
|-
|rowspan=2|Lord Forbes (1442)||William Forbes, 7th Lord Forbes||1547||1593||Died
|-
|John Forbes, 8th Lord Forbes||1593||1606||
|-
|rowspan=2|Lord Maxwell (1445)||John Maxwell, 8th Lord Maxwell||1555||1593||Died
|-
|John Maxwell, 9th Lord Maxwell||1593||1613||
|-
|Lord Glamis (1445)||Patrick Lyon, 9th Lord Glamis||1578||1615||
|-
|Lord Lindsay of the Byres (1445)||James Lindsay, 7th Lord Lindsay||1589||1601||
|-
|rowspan=2|Lord Saltoun (1445)||George Abernethy, 7th Lord Saltoun||1587||1590||
|-
|John Abernethy, 8th Lord Saltoun||1590||1612||
|-
|Lord Gray (1445)||Patrick Gray, 5th Lord Gray||1584||1608||
|-
|Lord Sinclair (1449)||Henry Sinclair, 5th Lord Sinclair||1570||1601||
|-
|Lord Fleming (1451)||John Fleming, 6th Lord Fleming||1572||1619||
|-
|Lord Seton (1451)||Robert Seton, 8th Lord Seton||1586||1603||
|-
|rowspan=2|Lord Borthwick (1452)||James Borthwick, 7th Lord Borthwick||1582||1599||Died
|-
|John Borthwick, 8th Lord Borthwick||1599||1623||
|-
|rowspan=2|Lord Boyd (1454)||Robert Boyd, 5th Lord Boyd||1558||1590||Died
|-
|Thomas Boyd, 6th Lord Boyd||1590||1611||
|-
|rowspan=2|Lord Oliphant (1455)||Laurence Oliphant, 4th Lord Oliphant||1566||1593||Died
|-
|Laurence Oliphant, 5th Lord Oliphant||1593||1631||
|-
|rowspan=2|Lord Livingston (1458)||William Livingstone, 6th Lord Livingston||1553||1592||Died
|-
|Alexander Livingston, 7th Lord Livingston||1592||1623||
|-
|Lord Cathcart (1460)||Alan Cathcart, 4th Lord Cathcart||1547||1618||
|-
|Lord Lovat (1464)||Simon Fraser, 6th Lord Lovat||1577||1633||
|-
|Lord Innermeath (1470)||John Stewart, 6th Lord Innermeath||1585||1603||Created Earl of Atholl, see above
|-
|Lord Carlyle of Torthorwald (1473)||Elizabeth Douglas, 5th Lady Carlyle||1575||1605||
|-
|Lord Home (1473)||Alexander Home, 6th Lord Home||1575||1619||
|-
|Lord Crichton of Sanquhar (1488)||Robert Crichton, 8th Lord Crichton of Sanquhar||1569||1612||
|-
|Lord Drummond of Cargill (1488)||Patrick Drummond, 3rd Lord Drummond||1571||1600||
|-
|rowspan=2|Lord Hay of Yester (1488)||William Hay, 6th Lord Hay of Yester||1586||1591||Died
|-
|James Hay, 7th Lord Hay of Yester||1591||1609||
|-
|Lord Sempill (1489)||Robert Sempill, 4th Lord Sempill||1576||1611||
|-
|rowspan=2|Lord Herries of Terregles (1490)||Agnes Maxwell, 4th Lady Herries of Terregles||1543||1594||Died
|-
|William Maxwell, 5th Lord Herries of Terregles||1594||1604||
|-
|Lord Ogilvy of Airlie (1491)||James Ogilvy, 5th Lord Ogilvy of Airlie||1549||1606||
|-
|rowspan=2|Lord Ross (1499)||Robert Ross, 5th Lord Ross||1581||1595||Died
|-
|James Ross, 6th Lord Ross||1595||1633||
|-
|Lord Elphinstone (1509)||Robert Elphinstone, 3rd Lord Elphinstone||1547||1602||
|-
|rowspan=2|Lord Ochiltree (1543)||Andrew Stewart, 2nd Lord Ochiltree||1548||1591||Died
|-
|Andrew Stuart, 3rd Lord Ochiltree||1591||1615||
|-
|Lord Torphichen (1564)||James Sandilands, 2nd Lord Torphichen||1579||1617||
|-
|Lord Doune (1581)||James Stewart, 1st Lord Doune||1581||1590||Title succeeded by the Earl of Moray, see above
|-
|Lord Dingwall (1584)||Andrew Keith, 1st Lord Dingwall||1584||abt. 1599||Died, title extinct
|-
|Lord Paisley (1587)||Claud Hamilton, 1st Lord Paisley||1587||1621||
|-
|rowspan=2|Lord Maitland (1590)||John Maitland, 1st Lord Maitland of Thirlestane||1590||1595||New creation, died
|-
|John Maitland, 2nd Lord Maitland of Thirlestane||1595||1645||
|-
|Lord Spynie (1590)||Alexander Lindsay, 1st Lord Spynie||1590||1607||New creation
|-
|Lord Newbottle (1591)||Mark Kerr, 1st Lord Newbottle||1591||1609||New creation
|-
|Lord Fyvie (1598)||Alexander Seton, 1st Lord Fyvie||1598||1622||New creation
|-
|}

Peerage of Ireland

|rowspan=3|Earl of Kildare (1316)||Henry FitzGerald, 12th Earl of Kildare||1585||1597||Died
|-
|William FitzGerald, 13th Earl of Kildare||1597||1599||
|-
|Gerald FitzGerald, 14th Earl of Kildare||1599||1612||
|-
|Earl of Ormond (1328)||Thomas Butler, 10th Earl of Ormond||1546||1614||
|-
|rowspan=2|Earl of Waterford (1446)||George Talbot, 6th Earl of Waterford||1560||1590||Died
|-
|Gilbert Talbot, 7th Earl of Waterford||1590||1616||
|-
|Earl of Tyrone (1542)||Hugh O'Neill, 3rd Earl of Tyrone||1562||1608||
|-
|Earl of Clanricarde (1543)||Ulick Burke, 3rd Earl of Clanricarde||1582||1601||
|-
|Earl of Thomond (1543)||Donogh O'Brien, 4th Earl of Thomond||1581||1624||
|-
|Earl of Clancare (1565)||Donald McCarthy, 1st Earl of Clancare||1565||1597||Resigned
|-
|rowspan=2|Viscount Gormanston (1478)||Christopher Preston, 4th Viscount Gormanston||1569||1599||Died
|-
|Jenico Preston, 5th Viscount Gormanston||1599||1630||
|-
|Viscount Buttevant (1541)||David de Barry, 5th Viscount Buttevant||1581||1617||
|-
|Viscount Mountgarret (1550)||Edmund Butler, 2nd Viscount Mountgarret||1571||1602||
|-
|Baron Athenry (1172)||Edmond I de Bermingham||1580||1612||
|-
|rowspan=2|Baron Kingsale (1223)||Gerald de Courcy, 17th Baron Kingsale||1535||1599||Died
|-
|John de Courcy, 18th Baron Kingsale||1599||1628||
|-
|rowspan=2|Baron Kerry (1223)||Thomas Fitzmaurice, 16th Baron Kerry||1550||1590||Died
|-
|Patrick Fitzmaurice, 17th Baron Kerry||1590||1600||
|-
|rowspan=2|Baron Slane (1370)||Thomas Fleming, 10th Baron Slane||1578||1597||Died
|-
|William Fleming, 11th Baron Slane||1597||1612||
|-
|Baron Howth (1425)||Nicholas St Lawrence, 9th Baron Howth||1589||1606||
|-
|rowspan=2|Baron Killeen (1449)||James Plunkett, 8th Baron Killeen||1567||1595||Died
|-
|Christopher Plunkett, 9th Baron Killeen||1595||1613||
|-
|rowspan=2|Baron Trimlestown (1461)||Peter Barnewall, 6th Baron Trimlestown||1573||1598||Died
|-
|Robert Barnewall, 7th Baron Trimlestown||1598||1639||
|-
|Baron Dunsany (1462)||Patrick Plunkett, 7th Baron of Dunsany||1564||1601||
|-
|Baron Delvin (1486)||Christopher Nugent, 6th Baron Delvin||1559||1602||
|-
|rowspan=2|Baron Power (1535)||John Power, 3rd Baron Power||1545||1592||Died
|-
|Richard Power, 4th Baron Power||1592||1607||
|-
|Baron Dunboyne (1541)||James Butler, 2nd/12th Baron Dunboyne||1566||1624||
|-
|Baron Louth (1541)||Oliver Plunkett, 4th Baron Louth||1575||1607||
|-
|Baron Upper Ossory (1541)||Florence Fitzpatrick, 3rd Baron Upper Ossory||1581||1613||
|-
|rowspan=2|Baron Inchiquin (1543)||Murrough O'Brien, 4th Baron Inchiquin||1573||1597||Died
|-
|Dermod O'Brien, 5th Baron Inchiquin||1597||1624||
|-
|Baron Ardenerie (1580)||William Bourke, 2nd Baron Ardenerie||1580||1591||Died; title extinct
|-
|rowspan=4|Baron Bourke of Castleconnell (1580)||John Bourke, 2nd Baron Bourke of Connell||1584||1592||Died
|-
|Richard Bourke, 3rd Baron Bourke of Connell||1592||1599||Died
|-
|Thomas Bourke, 4th Baron Bourke of Connell||1599||1599||Died
|-
|Edmund Bourke, 5th Baron Bourke of Connell||1599||1635||
|-
|rowspan=2|Baron Cahir (1583)||Theobald Butler, 1st Baron Cahir||1583||1596||Died
|-
|Thomas Butler, 2nd Baron Cahir||1596||1627||
|-
|}

References

 

Lists of peers by decade
1590s in England
1590s in Ireland
16th century in England
16th century in Scotland
16th century in Ireland
16th-century English nobility
16th-century Scottish peers
16th-century Irish people
Peers
1590s-related lists